This is a list of launches performed by Ariane carrier rockets between 2000 and 2009. During this period, the Ariane 4 was retired from service in favour of the Ariane 5.

Launch statistics

Rocket configurations

Launch outcomes

Launch history

References